Catald of Taranto (also Cataldus, Cathaluds, Cathaldus, Cat(t)aldo, Cathal; fl. 7th century) was an Irish monk.

Biography

Cataldus was born in Munster and became the disciple and successor of Carthage in the famous School of Lismore, County Waterford. He is believed to have been consecrated a bishop in Ireland. His apparent desire for a life of solitude saw him venture off to Jerusalem on a pilgrimage.

On his return home his ship was wrecked off the Italian coast, near the city of Taranto. The people here appear to have encouraged the monk to accept the government of their church. Some of the miracles claimed through Catald's intercession include protecting the city against the plague and floods that, apparently, had occurred in neighbouring areas.

When his coffin was opened in the eleventh century, it contained a gold cross left at the time of his burial. The relics of the saint were then encased and preserved in the high altar of the cathedral.

Legacy
His feast day is 10 May.

Saint Cathal was the patron of the Sicilian Normans.

San Cataldo is the patron saint of Supino, located in the province of Frosinone and the region of Lazio.

The Cattedrale di San Cataldo is the archiepiscopal see of the Archdiocese of Taranto. The Chiesa di San Cataldo in Palermo, Sicily is a World Heritage site. The parish church in Montenero Sabino, province of Rieti, in the region of the Lazio, is dedicated to San Cataldo.

The Italian towns of San Cataldo (there is such a town in Sicily, and a  modern sea resort in the Apulian Province of Lecce) are named in his honour.

See also
 Saint Gall
 Columbanus
 Petrus de Ibernia
 James of Ireland
 List of Catholic saints

References

External links

 "Saint Catald"

Medieval Italian saints
Italian Roman Catholic saints
7th-century Christian saints
Medieval Irish saints
Colombanian saints
7th-century archbishops
7th-century Irish bishops
Irish expatriates in Italy
People from County Waterford
685 deaths